These are lists of regions and countries by their estimated real gross domestic product (GDP) in terms of purchasing power parity (PPP), the value of all final goods and services produced within a country/region in a given year. GDP dollar (international dollar) estimates here are derived from PPP estimates.

Methodology 
In the absence of sufficient data for nearly all economies until well into the 19th century, past GDP cannot be calculated, but at best only roughly estimated. In a first step, economic historians try to reconstruct the GDP per capita for a given political or geographical entity from the meagre evidence. This value is then multiplied by estimated population size, another determinant for which as a rule only little ancient data is available.

A key notion in the whole process is that of subsistence, the income level which is necessary for sustaining one's life. Since pre-modern societies, by modern standards, were characterized by a very low degree of urbanization and a large majority of people working in the agricultural sector, economic historians prefer to express income in cereal units. To achieve comparability over space and time, these numbers are then converted into monetary units such as International Dollars, a third step which leaves a relatively wide margin of interpretation.

The formula thus is: GDP (PPP) = GDP per capita (PPP) x population size

It should be stressed that, historically speaking, population size is the far more important multiplier in the equation. This is because, in contrast to industrial economies, the average income ceiling of premodern agrarian societies was quite low everywhere, possibly not higher than twice the subsistence level. Therefore, the total GDP as given below primarily reflects the respective historical population size, and is much less indicative of contemporary living standards than, for example, estimations of past GDP per capita are.

According to the 20th-century macroeconomist Paul Bairoch, a pioneer in historical economic analysis, 

Rather, Bairoch advocates a formula combining GNP per capita and total GNP to give a better measure of the economic performance of national economies.

World

1750–1990 (Bairoch) 
In his 1995 book Economics and World History, economic historian Paul Bairoch gave the following estimates in terms of 1960 US dollars, for GNP from 1750 to 1990, comparing what are today the Third World (Asia, Africa, Latin America) and the First World (Western Europe, Northern America, Japan)

A  Third World refers to Asia (excluding Japan), Africa, and Latin America.

B  First World refers to Europe, Russia, the United States, Canada, and Japan.

1–2008 (Maddison) 
The following estimates are taken exclusively from the 2007 monograph Contours of the World Economy, 1–2030 AD by the British economist Angus Maddison.

When graphed, one can see China is reasserting its position as the world's largest economy, which it had lost around 1890.  

There was little difference in GDP per capita based on level of development in earlier eras, so in 1500, China was the largest economy in the world, followed closely by India.

A  From 1 AD to 1913 AD, India includes modern Pakistan and Bangladesh. From 1950 onwards, India refers only to the modern Republic of India.

Maddison' assumptions have been both admired and criticized by academics and journalists. By Bryan Haig, who has characterized Maddison's figures for 19th century Australia as "inaccurate and irrelevant", by W. W. Rostow, according to whom "this excessive macroeconomic bias also causes him (Maddison) to mis-date, in my view, the beginning of what he calls the capitalist era at 1820 rather than, say, the mid-1780s."

W. J. MacPherson has described Maddison's work on early medieval India of using "dubious comparative data." Maddison's estimates have also been critically reviewed and revised by the Italian economists Giovanni Federico and Elio Lo Cascio/Paolo Malanima (see below).

However, economist and journalist Evan Davis has praised Maddison's research by citing it as a "fantastic publication" and that it was "based on the detailed scholarship of the world expert on historical economic data Angus Maddison." He also added that "One shouldn't read the book in the belief the statistics are accurate to 12 decimal places."

Europe

1830–1938 (Bairoch) 
The following estimates were made by the economic historian Paul Bairoch. Contrary to most other estimates on this page, the GNP (at market prices) is given here in 1960 US dollars. Unlike Maddison, Bairoch allows for the fluctuation of borders, basing his estimates mostly on the historical boundaries at the given points in time.

1500–1870 (Lo Cascio/Malanima) 
The following estimates are taken from a revision of Angus Maddison's numbers for the whole of Europe by the Italian economists Elio Lo Cascio and Paolo Malanima. According to their calculations, the basic level of European GDP (PPP) was historically higher, but its increase was less pronounced.

Empires

Indian empires (1–1947 CE)

Angus Maddison's below GDP estimates for Indian subcontinent (including modern Pakistan and Bangladesh) refer to the following empires:

^ At year 1, year 1000, year 1500 and till the start of British colonisation in India in 17th century, India's GDP always varied between ~25 - 65% world's total GDP, which dropped to 2% by Independence of India in 1947. At the same time, the Britain's share of the world economy rose from 2.9% in 1700 up to 9% in 1870 alone.

Chinese empires 
Angus Maddison's below GDP estimates for China refer to the following empires:

British Empire and India
Goedele De Keersmaeker estimated the GDP of the British Empire using Angus Maddison's data. Keersmaeker estimated that the British Empire's share of world GDP was 24.28% in 1870 and 19.7% in 1913. The empire's largest economy in 1870 was British India with a 12.15% share of world GDP, followed by the United Kingdom with a 9.03% share. The empire's largest economy in 1913 was the United Kingdom with an 8.22% share of world GDP, followed by British India with a 7.47% share.

Roman/Byzantine Empire 

Much work in estimating past GDP has been done in the study of the Roman economy, following the pioneering studies by Keith Hopkins (1980) and Raymond Goldsmith (1984). The estimates by Peter Temin, Angus Maddison, Branko Milanović and Peter Fibiger Bang follow the basic method established by Goldsmith, varying mainly only in their set of initial numbers; these are then stepped up to estimations of the expenditure checked by those on the income side. Walter Scheidel/Steven Friesen determine GDP on the relationship between certain significant economic indicators which were historically found to be plausible; two independent control assumptions provide the upper and lower limit of the probable size of the Roman GDP.

B Decimal fractions rounded to the nearest tenth. Italic numbers not directly given by the authors; they are obtained by multiplying the respective value of GDP per capita by estimated population size.

The GDP per capita of the Byzantine Empire, the continuation of the Roman Empire in the east, has been estimated by the World Bank economist Branko Milanović to range between $680 and 770 (in 1990 International Dollars) at its peak around 1000 AD, that is the reign of Basil II. The Byzantine population size at the time is estimated to have been 12 to 18 million. This would yield a total GDP somewhere between $8,160 and 13,860 million.

See also 

 Exploitation colonialism
 List of countries by largest historical GDP

References

Citations

Bibliography 
 GDP of the Roman Empire
Bang, Peter Fibiger (2008): The Roman Bazaar: A Comparative Study of Trade and Markets in a Tributary Empire, Cambridge University Press, pp. 86–91
Goldsmith, Raymond W. (1984): "An Estimate of the Size and Structure of the National Product of the Early Roman Empire", Review of Income and Wealth, Vol. 30, No. 3, pp. 263–288
Hopkins, Keith (1980): "Taxes and Trade in the Roman Empire (200 B.C.–A.D. 400)", The Journal of Roman Studies, Vol. 70, pp. 101–125
Hopkins, Keith (1995/6): "Rome, Taxes, Rents, and Trade", Kodai, Vol. 6/7, pp. 41–75
Milanovic, Branko; Lindert, Peter H.; Williamson, Jeffrey G. (Oct. 2007): "Measuring Ancient Inequality’, NBER Working Paper 13550, pp. 58–66
Scheidel, Walter; Friesen, Steven J. (Nov. 2009): "The Size of the Economy and the Distribution of Income in the Roman Empire", The Journal of Roman Studies, Vol. 99, pp. 61–91
Temin, Peter (2006): "Estimating GDP in the Early Roman Empire", Lo Cascio, Elio (ed.): Innovazione tecnica e progresso economico nel mondo romano, Edipuglia, Bari, pp. 31–54

 GDP of the Byzantine Empire
Milanovic, Branko (2006): "An Estimate of Average Income and Inequality in Byzantium around Year 1000", Review of Income and Wealth, Vol. 52, No. 3, pp. 449–470

 European GDP per capita
Bairoch, Paul (1976): "Europe's Gross National Product: 1800–1975", Journal of European Economic History, Vol. 5, pp. 273–340

 Angus Maddison — reviews and revisions
Maddison, Angus (2007): "Contours of the World Economy, 1–2030 AD. Essays in Macro-Economic History", Oxford University Press, p. 379, table A.4.
Federico, Giovanni (2002): "The World Economy 0–2000 AD: A Review Article", European Review of Economic History, Vol. 6, No. 1, pp. 111–120 — review
Lo Cascio, Elio; Malanima, Paolo (Dec. 2009): "GDP in Pre-Modern Agrarian Economies (1–1820 AD). A Revision of the Estimates", Rivista di storia economica, Vol. 25, No. 3, pp. 391–420 — critique of Maddison's estimates

External links 
 Angus Maddison — Historical statistics 
 Walter Scheidel — Papers on ancient economy and demography

GDP (PPP) Regions
GDP (PPP) Regions
GDP (PPP)
GDP (PPP)